Mume or MUME may refer to:

 Multi-Users in Middle-earth, a free multiplayer role-playing game based upon J.R.R. Tolkien's Middle-earth

Museums 

 Exile Memorial Museum, a history museum in Catalonia
 Museo de la Memoria (Uruguay), a museum in Montevideo, Uruguay
 Regional Museum of Messina, a museum of Messina, Italy

See also 
 Prunus mume, a species of Asian plum